
Gmina Kleszczele is an urban-rural gmina (administrative district) in Hajnówka County, Podlaskie Voivodeship, in north-eastern Poland, on the border with Belarus.

Villages
Apart from the town of Kleszczele, Gmina Kleszczele contains the villages and settlements of Biała Straż, Dąbrowa, Dasze, Dobrowoda, Gruzka, Kośna, Kuraszewo, Piotrowszczyzna, Pogreby, Policzna, Repczyce, Rowy, Sad, Saki, Suchowolce, Toporki, Zaleszany and Żuki.

Neighbouring gminas
Gmina Kleszczele is bordered by the gminas of Boćki, Czeremcha, Dubicze Cerkiewne, Milejczyce and Orla. It also borders Belarus.

References
Polish official population figures 2006

Kleszczele
Hajnówka County